State Route 69A (SR 69A) is a  state highway and alternate route of SR 69 in the western portion of the U.S. state of Tennessee. It travels through a mostly rural area of western Tennessee.

Route description

SR 69A begins in downtown Camden at an intersection with US 70 Bus./SR 191/SR 391. The route travels to the north on North Forrest Avenue, it then turns west onto West Frazier Street and then back north onto Washington Drive. SR 69A passes Camden's middle and high schools and leaves the city limits. The route twists and turns continuing northward to the town of Big Sandy where the route intersects SR 147 and turns west. It continues a westerly course until it meets its northern terminus, an intersection with US 641/SR 69 in Paris. Except at its north end, the entire route of SR 69A is a two-lane highway.

Major intersections

References

See also
List of state routes in Tennessee
Tennessee State Route 69

069A
Transportation in Henry County, Tennessee
Transportation in Benton County, Tennessee
Paris, Tennessee